Typical pulmonary carcinoid tumour  is a subtype of pulmonary carcinoid tumour. It is an uncommon low-grade malignant lung mass that is most often in the central airways of the lung.

Signs and symptoms
Lung carcinoids typically present with a cough or hemoptysis.  Findings may closely mimic malignant tumours of the lung, i.e. lung cancer.

Diagnosis

The definitive diagnosis is rendered by a microscopic examination, after excision.  Typical carcinoids have cells with stippled chromatin and a moderate quantity of cytoplasm.  They typically have few mitoses and lack necrosis.  By definition, they are greater than 4 mm in largest dimension; smaller lesions are referred to as pulmonary carcinoid tumourlets.

The differential diagnosis of typical pulmonary carcinoid tumour includes: atypical pulmonary carcinoid tumour, pulmonary carcinoid tumourlet and lung adenocarcinoma.

Treatment
Typical carcinoids are usually treated with surgical excision.

See also 
 Pulmonary tumor
 Lung cancer
 Atypical pulmonary carcinoid tumour
 Pulmonary neuroendocrine tumor

References

External links 

 Lung carcinoids (cancer.org)

Pulmonary tumour